The year 1613 in music involved some significant events.

Events 
February 15 – The Memorable Masque of the Middle Temple and Lincoln's Inn, written by George Chapman and designed by Inigo Jones, is performed at Whitehall Palace. The masque features music by Robert Johnson.
February 20 – Francis Beaumont's The Masque of the Inner Temple and Gray's Inn is performed at Whitehall Palace. The work features music by John Coprario.
December 26 – The Maske of Flowers by Thomas Campion and John Coprario is performed for the wedding of Robert Carr, 1st Earl of Somerset and Frances Howard at Whitehall Palace.
Monteverdi becomes  at St Mark's Basilica, Venice.
date unknown – Michael Praetorius joins the court of John George I, Elector of Saxony.

Publications
Agostino Agazzari – Dialogici concentus..., Op. 16 (Venice: Ricciardo Amadino)
Gregor Aichinger –  (Dillingen: Gregor Hänlin)
Giovanni Francesco Anerio
Third book of motets (Rome: Giovanni Battista Robletti)
Antiphons (Rome: Giovanni Battista Robletti)
Adriano Banchieri
, Op. 33 (Venice: Ricciardo Amadino), a collection of psalms for four voices
 (Venice: Giacomo Vincenti), a collection of musical exercises for aspiring singers
 (Venice: Giacomo Vincenti), a collection of musical exercises for instrumentalists
 for four voices (Venice: Giacomo Vincenti)
Lodovico Bellanda –  for solo voice with organ, theorbo, or similar instrument (Venice: Bartolomeo Magni)
Giulio Belli –  for two and three voices (Venice: Bartolomeo Magni)
Antonio Brunelli –  for one, two, and three voices, Op. 9 (Venice: Giacomo Vincenti)
Manuel Cardoso –  for four and five voices (Lisbon: Pedro Craesbeck)
Antonio Cifra
Sixth book of motets for two, three, and four voices, Op. 13 (Rome: Giovanni Battista Robletti)
 for eight and twelve voices, Op. 15 (Rome: Giovanni Battista Robletti)
John Coprario – Songs of Mourning: Bewailing the Untimely Death of Prince Henry for one voice with lute or viol (London: John Browne), lyrics by Thomas Campion, commemorating the death of Henry Frederick, Prince of Wales, on the previous November 6
Christoph Demantius –  for five voices and instruments (Nuremberg: Balthasar Scherff for David Kauffmann), a collection of German and Polish dances
Giacomo Finetti
Melchior Franck
 (Musical Garden) for five, six, seven, eight, nine, and ten voices (Nuremberg: Georg Fuhrmann), a collection of motets
 for six and eight voices (Coburg: Justus Hauck), a collection of wedding songs
 for four voices (Coburg: Justus Hauck), a collection of quodlibets
Luzzasco Luzzaschi – , published posthumously
Giovanni de Macque – Sixth book of madrigals for five voices (Venice: Bartolomeo Magni)
Pomponio Nenna – First book of madrigals for four voices (Naples: Giovanni Battista Gargano & Lucretio Nucci)
Pietro Pace
The first book of motets for 1. 2. 3. & 4. voices..., Op. 5 (Venice: Giacomo Vincenti)
The first book of madrigals for solo voice... (Venice: Giacomo Vincenti)
Serafino Patta – Second book of sacred songs (Venice: Giacomo Vincenti)
Peter Philips
 (Antwerp: Pierre Phalèse)
 (Sacred Little Gems) for two and three voices with organ bass (Antwerp: Pierre Phalèse)
Francis Pilkington – The first set of madrigals and pastorals of 3. 4. and 5. parts (London: William Barley for M. Lownes, J. Browne and Thomas Snodham)
Salamone Rossi – a collection of sinfonie and gagliarde
John Ward – The First Set of English Madrigals To 3. 4. 5. and 6. parts apt both for Viols and Voyces

Classical music 
John Bull – God the father, God the son (performed at the wedding of Princess Elizabeth to Frederick V, Elector Palatine).
Nicholas Lanier – Maske... at the Marriage of... The Earl of Somerset

Opera 
Giordano Giacobbi – Proserpina rapita

Births 
April 19 – Christoph Bach, court musician, grandfather of Johann Sebastian Bach (d. 1661)
August 20 – Sophie Elisabeth, Duchess of Brunswick-Lüneburg, poet and composer (d. 1676)

Deaths 
July 10 – Giulio Cesare Martinengo, composer and teacher (born c.1564)
August 18 – Giovanni Artusi, music theorist and composer (born c. 1540)
September 8 – Carlo Gesualdo, lutenist and composer (born 1560)
?October – Pomponio Nenna, composer of madrigals (born 1556)

References

 
Music
17th century in music
Music by year